The Utah physa, scientific name Physella utahensis, is a species of freshwater snail, an aquatic gastropod mollusk in the family Physidae. The common name refers to the state of Utah.

This species is endemic to the United States and is known from Utah, Colorado, and Wyoming.

References

Physidae
Freshwater animals of North America
Molluscs of the United States
Physa
Gastropods described in 1925
Taxonomy articles created by Polbot
Taxa named by William J. Clench